Woolstone may refer to the following places in the United Kingdom:

 Woolstone, Gloucestershire, a location
 Woolstone, Milton Keynes in Buckinghamshire
 Woolstone, Oxfordshire